Twilley is the first studio album by power pop musician Dwight Twilley. He recorded it after the Dwight Twilley Band disbanded.

Track listing
All songs written by Dwight Twilley.

Personnel
Dwight Twilley – vocals, guitar, piano, harmonica, percussion
Phil Seymour – backing vocals (7)
Jim Lewis – bass, drums
Jerry Naifeh – drums (3 and 10)
Noah Shark – percussion
Bill Pitcock IV – lead guitar
Jimmy Haskell – strings
Greg Block – violin (3)

Production personnel
Dwight Twilley – producer
Noah Shark – engineer, producer
Max Reese – producer
Jim Lewis – engineer
Hartmann & Goodman – management
Zox – Cover art

References

Dwight Twilley albums
Arista Records albums
1979 albums